This article describes the selection process, by country, for entrance into the International Mathematical Olympiad.

The International Mathematical Olympiad (IMO) is an annual mathematics olympiad for students younger than 20 who have not started at university.

Each year, participating countries send at most 6 students. The selection process varies between countries, but typically involves several rounds of competition, each progressively more difficult, after which the number of candidates is repeatedly reduced until the final 6 are chosen.

Many countries also run training events for IMO potentials, with the aim of improving performance as well as assisting with team selection.

IMO Selection process by country

Argentina 
In Argentina, the Olimpíada Matemática Argentina is organized each year by Fundación Olimpíada Matemática Argentina. All students that took and passed the National Finals (fifth and last round of the competition) exams, usually held in November; and were born before July 1 21 years ago, are allowed to take two new written tests to be selected for IMO, usually in May. From the results of that tests, six titular students and a number of substitutes are selected to represent Argentina at the International Mathematical Olympiad.

Australia 
In Australia, selection into the IMO team is determined by the Australian Mathematics Trust and is based on the results from four exams:
 The Australian Mathematics Olympiad
 The Asian Pacific Mathematics Olympiad
 two IMO selection exams

The Australian Mathematics Olympiad (AMO) is held annually in the second week of February. It is composed of two four-hour papers held over two consecutive days. There are four questions in each exam for a total of eight questions. Entry is by invitation only with approximately 100 candidates per year.

A month after the AMO, the Asian Pacific Mathematics Olympiad is held (APMO) and the top 25 from the AMO are invited to sit the exam. It is a four and a half hour exam with five questions.

The top 12 students from the AMO and APMO (along with another 12 or so junior students) are then invited to a ten-day camp held in Sydney in the April school holidays. During this camp,3 times (four-and-a-half hour 
selection exams) are held, each with three questions. The top six candidates along with a reserve are then announced as part of the team mostly based on their results in the three exams.

Bangladesh 
The selection process is organised by Bangladesh Mathematical Olympiad.
There are four levels of selection in Bangladesh. The students can participate in four academic categories: primary, junior, secondary and higher secondary.

Preliminary Selection: This is the first step of the selection. This is mainly done in district level. The selected contestants then go for the divisional round. Students are given 7 problems and have to solve them with in 1hr 15mins.
 Divisional: Currently(2011) the country is divided in 13 regions for divisional Olympiad. The number of divisions may increase later. Except Dhaka division, roughly 150 students participate each of the divisional Olympiads and 40 are selected for the next level. In Dhaka division, where number of students are more than the others, 300 students participate and 60 to 70 students are selected. All problems in the divisional test are "To find" problems. The students need not to write down the solution, only the answer is necessary. The test is usually one hour long.
 National: The national Olympiad is a 3-4 hour test depending on the category. In this test the students must write down the solutions of the problems. Some of the winners from junior, secondary and higher secondary categories of this level are selected for the next level.
Cut-marks depend on overall performance of every participants in this level.
 The camps: More than one camps are arranged to select students for IMO. The selection process in the camps are not so straight forward as it is in the Olympiads. The students in the camps are closely monitored by the previous campers and coaches and four to six students are selected for IMO.

Brazil 
The Brazilian participants are selected in a two phase process:
1st. The contestants that are awarded medals or honorable mentions in the Brazilian Mathematical Olympiad (OBM) (Olimpíada Brasileira de Matemática)of the year before the IMO are selected to participate in a training process to the IMO.
2nd. The contestants take a series of tests, which have IMO-like level, and the top students are invited to join the Brazilian team that goes to IMO.

Belgium 
The Belgian team is bilingual. The Dutch-speaking community selects three participants during the Vlaamse Wiskunde Olympiade. The French-speaking community selects their three participants through the Olympiade Mathématique Belge and additional tests at training weekends.

Canada 
High school students must first write the Canadian Open Mathematics Challenge, which takes place around November. If they score high enough in the COMC(normally 70+), they will be invited to write the Canadian Mathematics Olympiad (CMO), Asian Pacific Mathematics Olympiad (APMO), and unofficially write the USAMO.

The students with the top scores (conditions permitting) will make the Canadian team and travel to the location of the IMO in that year. Although the team is made up of students from all over Canada, Toronto and its suburbs have produced the most people for the team due to its high population density. The Canadian Mathematical Society is the organization which selects team leaders and members for the IMO team.

China 
In mainland China, high school students have the annual National Highschool Mathematics Competitions, held on the second Sunday of September. The top-scoring competitors from each province, usually 3 to 5 (but for very strong provinces, such as Beijing, it can be up to 15), will be invited to participate in the China Mathematics Olympiads. Approximately the top 60 competitors of CMO will go to a training campus; After two tests, the top 15 competitors in the campus will stay and take another four tests. In the end, the 6 students with highest scores will form the Chinese team. China has been very successful at the IMO in the past 20 years.

Colombia 
In Colombia the selection and preparation of students for math competitions is organized by Olimpiadas Colombianas de Matemáticas. The process begins with the regional competitions which are held in October and November. The best students of these competitions are invited to the January Training Session. In early March the National Competition or Olimpiada Colombiana de Matemáticas begins. It consists of a sequence of four examinations: the classificatoria, the selectiva, the semifinal and the ronda final. The latter contains a (prior) training session and then two days of IMO-style papers.

Every Colombian high school student can take part in the first "classifying" examination but afterwards students are invited to compete according to their results on the previous examination. The three best students of the three different high school levels of the final round examination are the winners of the Colombian Math Olympiad. Although in principle students of the lower levels may be selected to go to the IMO, it generally takes many years before they can compete with students of the highest level or nivel superior. After the National Competition the twenty best students of each level are invited to the June Training Session where students undergo the IMO selection process.

Croatia 
Hrvatsko matematičko društvo invites about 20 contestants who performed best at the national level (national level competition is separated by age) to the Croatian Mathematical Olympiad (Hrvatska matematička olimpijada, HMO) which consists of 2 days, 4 problems each. The best ~10 are invited to the IMO test, the rest to the MEMO test. The best six at the IMO test and HMO combined are selected for IMO.

Cuba 
In Cuba the selection process consists (depending on regional conditions of availability of resources, participants and organizers) six levels. Competitions are held to select the best candidates from each school, then from each municipality, then from each province who then are allowed to take part in the National Competition (Concurso Nacional in Spanish). The gold and silver medals (around 20 participants) take a number of further exams closer to the level of International competitions. Thirteen of these are selected to form the National Pre-Selection that trains for up to three months taking also exams out of which the best 6 are selected to form the National team. In a number of years the lack of financial support has allowed only the first member of the team to actually travel and compete in the International mathematical Olympiad.

Cyprus 

In Cyprus Four provincial competitions and a National (Pancyprian) competition are held every year. During this procedure 30 students are selected and Four Team Selection Tests are held to determine who will be the six member of national team for IMO

In every competition or test there are four problem usually covering geometry, number theory, algebra, and combinatorics (elementary level) and last four hours each.

Czech Republic 
After successfully completing the school and regional rounds, roughly 50 best participants are invited to the national round, where 10 best students are selected to participate in a week-long selection campus. Each day they solve a set of 3-4 problems, taken mainly from the past national olympiads of various countries. On the last day they have to find the answers (this time in form of a number) to rather large set of shorter problems under significant time-pressure. After that the team is selected and before the actual IMO, it competes in traditional Czech-Slovak-Polish Mathematical Contest where the participants can practise their skill under almost identical conditions to IMO.

Denmark 
In Denmark a national contest open to all high school students is held every year called "Georg Mohr-Konkurrencen" (the Georg Mohr Contest) named after a Danish mathematician. The top 20 of this contest are then invited to another contest where the final team is selected.

France 
The Association Animath, and more precisely the Olympiade Française de Mathématiques prepares and selects the French IMO team. Students who succeed at a preselection test can get from Animath a year-long training, after which the team is selected by an IMO-like test.

Germany 
IMO team selection in Germany is based on the main national mathematical competitions: The Bundeswettbewerb Mathematik (BWM, the former west German olympiad), the Deutsche Mathematik-Olympiade (DeMO, the former east German olympiad), and Jugend forscht (a research competition). Students successful in any of these competitions (e. g. a prize in the second round of the BWM) write two 3-hour exams at their schools, and the 16 best scorers of these exams are invited to a training program consisting of five seminars, where lectures are given and seven team selection tests are written - 4-hour exams determining the actual IMO contestants (additional tests are possible if the team is not uniquely determined after the seven exams).

Greece 
 Θαλής (Thalis) - first round
 Ευκλείδης (Euklidis) - second round
 Αρχιμήδης (Archimidis) - third round

Hong Kong 
Hong Kong first joined IMO in 1988.

Students can join IMO Training if they meet (at least one) of the requirements below:

Acquiring Distinction in ‘Introduction to Olympiad Mathematics’ (ITOM) course held by HKAGE in at least 1 Phase
Participating in China Girl’s Mathematical Olympiad (CGMO) Training held by HKAGE
Getting Honourable Mention, Bronze, Silver or Gold in International Mathematical Olympiad Preliminary Selection Contest - Hong Kong (also known as ‘Prelim’)

A total of 60-70 students will be selected to receive further training. Students are placed in either Level 1 (about 50 students) or Level 2 (about 20 students) training, while the students who completed Level 1 in the previous year are usually promoted to Level 2. There are three Phases in the training (Phase I: July to August; Phase II: September to December; Phase III: January to March). The Phase tests are:

Test 1 with 6 proof-based problems which questions are similar to Prelim’s in August
Iranian Geometry Olympiad (IGO) (Not compulsory) with 5 proof-based problems in October 
Test 2 with 4 proof-based problems in October 
Hong Kong (China) Mathematical Olympiad with 4 proof-based problems in December 
Asian Pacific Mathematics Olympiad with 5 proof-based problems in March

18 students are then chosen according to their results in all the Phase tests and Prelim to attend the additional tests, Test 3 and Test 4 in late April or May. 6 HK Team members and 6 alternate team members are then selected to join the Pre-IMO Intensive Training (also known as ‘Phase IV’) according to their results in all the tests mentioned above. The six HK team members will then join IMO.

In addition, 6 students are selected to join the Chinese Mathematical Olympiad (CMO) according to their results in the Phase tests in Phase I and II, and Prelim.

In the past, students are selected to join the China Western Mathematical Olympiad (CWMO), but IMOHKC has stopped sending representatives to CWMO.

Iceland 
Iceland first joined the IMO in 1985.

In Iceland, the Icelandic Mathematical Olympiad for Secondary School Students (Stærðfræðikeppni Framhaldsskólanema) was first held in the winter of 1984-1985, and it has been an annual occurrence ever since. It is hosted by the Icelandic Mathematical Organization and the Natural Sciences's Teacher Association. Its goals include increasing the interest of Icelandic secondary school students towards mathematics, and other fields built on a mathematical foundation.

The contest is held in two parts every winter. First, a qualifier held in October of every year on two difficulty levels; upper level, and lower level. The lower level is intended for first year secondary school students, and the upper level for older students. Those who do well in the qualifier are invited to the final competition, held in March.

Alongside honours and awards, the top students are selected to perform in various mathematical olympiads, including the Baltic Way, the Nordic Mathematical Contest, and the International Mathematical Olympiad.

India 
India has been participating in the IMO since 1989. The National Board for Higher Mathematics (NBHM) is in charge of the mathematical olympiad activity which has put Homi Bhabha Centre for Science Education (HBCSE) in-charge for the implementation.

The selection process consists of four stages: However the programme itself is of six stages.

 Stage 1 or Indian Olympiad Qualifiers in Mathematics: After pandemic PRMO & RMO is mixed and named IOQM.The examination paper comprises 24 problems to be solved over 3 Hours. The composition of the paper is 2 marker, 5 marker & 10 marker problems.
 Stage 2 or Indian National Mathematical Olympiad: The INMO is held on the third Sunday of January at 28 centers across the country. The examination paper comprises six problems to be solved over a time of four hours. The top students from the INMO (approximately 35) are invited for the fourth stage.
 Stage 3 or International Mathematical Olympiad Training Camp: It is held at HBCSE from April to May. At this camp, orientation is provided to students by resource persons from different institutions across the country. Several selection tests are held during this camp. Based on the performance in these tests, 6 students are selected to represent India at the IMO.
Stage 4 or Pre Departure camp for IMO
 Stage 5 or IMO: The Olympiad program culminates with the participation of the students in the IMO. 4 teachers or mentors accompany the students.

 Indonesia 
In Indonesia, National Mathematical Olympiad is held as a part of National Science Olympiad (Olimpiade Sains Nasional), and has been held annually since 2002. About 100-120 students who pass the province-level test will be eligible to participate in the National Mathematical Olympiad, which is held in August or September. About thirty students are chosen to get into the first training camp, which is held at October through November. About half of them will go to second training camp and participate in the Asian Pacific Mathematics Olympiad. At the end, six students are selected to represent the country. The selection depends on the results of regular tests held every week in every training camp, IMO simulation test and APMO.

 Ireland 
In Ireland, the top scorers in the Junior Certificate (a state exam taken around the age of 15-16) are invited by the various universities to take part in the Irish Mathematical Olympiad. The IrMO is held simultaneously in May in each of these universities. The test consists of two three-hour papers, each containing five questions, run on the same day. The top six students are selected for the national team.

 Israel 
As of 2023, the Weizmann Institute of Science is the academic institution that is responsible for the selection process.

The selection process is based on the four main national math competitions in Israel:

 The Ministry of Education's national mathematical Olympiad, which is open to all Israeli students and consists of two stages. The first stage is hosted on the ministry's website, this stage does not require full proofs. The next stage takes place simultaneously in a few academic institutions in Israel for the students who passed the first stage. Approximately 600 students participate in this stage each year.
 The Gillis Olympiad in the Weizmann Institute of Science.
 The Grossman Math Olympiad in the Technion – Israel Institute of Technology. 
 The Tournament of the Towns, which consists of 2 rounds: Fall (October) and Spring (February–March). Only the first round is considered for the selection process, except for special cases. 
To qualify for the final stage of the selection process, students must excel in one of these competitions. Approximately 100-200 students are invited to participate in the final stage, which is conducted at the Weizmann Institute of Science. The top 50 scoring students in this stage compose Israel's national mathematics team.

 Italy 
In Italy, the Italian Mathematical Olympiad is held every year; the full selection process is made up of four stages:
 the so-called Archimedean games, held as a multiple-choice test in all participating high schools in November
 the regional stage, held as a mixed test (multiple choice, numerical answers and proof-writing) in ca. 100 sites in February
 the national stage, held in Cesenatico at the beginning of May, composed of six problems requiring a full proof
 the team selection test, held in Pisa at the end of May after a five-day stage, composed of two sessions each containing three problems requiring a full proof.
The six-person team competing in the IMO is determined by summing up the scores of four different competitions: the senior national stage, held each September in Pisa, the Balkan selection test held each February in Pisa (also selecting the team competing in the BMO and in the RMM) composed by two papers with three problems, four and a half hours each, and then the national stage and the May stage held in Pisa.

 Japan 
In Japan, Japan Mathematical Olympiad (JMO) is held every year. JMO has two rounds: the first one in January and the second one in February. The best 20 scorers in JMO are invited to the spring training camp in March. The top six students in several tests at this camp are selected for the national team.

 Latvia 
In Latvia a national contest open to all high school students takes place each year. The best participants of regional contests are allowed to participate in the national olympiad held in Riga. The top students are further tested to select the national team.

 Malaysia 
The selection is based on the Olympiad Matematik Kebangsaan, OMK (National Mathematical Olympiad) and the subsequent training camps. Top OMK performers are selected to attend the training camps, and the final IMO representatives are selected based on the students' performance in the camps and race.

 Mexico 
The selecting process in Mexico has 3 stages and is organized by the Mexican Mathematical Olimpiad. At first stage, each of the 32 states select a team of up to 6 students which will represent the state in the national contest. The contest is held once at year, in the month of November.
According to the results of this contest, at least 16 students are selected, who will continue to the second stage of the selecting process, the national trainings, which are held from November to April in which the group of 16 students gets reduced to approximately 10.
In May the third stage of the contest is held, in which the six students that will represent Mexico in the next IMO. In similar process the teams for the Centroamerican and Caribbean Mathematical Olimpiad (OMCC) and Iberoamerican Mathematical Olimpiad (OIM) are selected. In March the test for the APMO is solved.

 Netherlands 
In the Netherlands the selecting process consists of three rounds.
The first round takes place on high schools. It contains 8 multiple-choice questions, and 4 open questions.
The second round takes place at twelve different universities. It contains 5 questions where the answer is a certain number and 2 open questions.
There are a few optional training days and then the third round takes place at the Eindhoven University of Technology. It contains 5 open questions.
The best 30 are invited to the training program. Throughout the next year the students take different test: the best 6 students will go to the IMO. The tests contains 4 or 5 open questions.

 External links 
Official site in English

 New Zealand 
The first selection is based on NZMO1, after which some of the students are invited to take the NZMO2. The top 24 students are then selected and invited to a residential one week training camp. At the end of the camp, approximately 12 students are selected as a squad. The squad receives regular assignments to complete every few weeks as well as sitting the British Maths Olympiad, Australian Maths Olympiad and the APMO. The final six candidates plus one reserve are later selected based on results of the assignments and these tests.

 Norway 
In Norway, the Niels Henrik Abels Matematikkonkurranse is held each year. The first selection, usually in November, consist of a multiple-choice exam with 20 problems. One is given 5 points for each correct answer, 1 point for each unanswered problem and 0 point for a wrong answer. Approximately 10% of the competing students are selected for the second selection, which is held in January. The examination consist of 10 problems, giving 10 points for each correct answer, who are integers between zero and one thousand. 20 students are then selected for a final four-hour-long examination consisting of four problems. While usually the 3 best students are automatically chosen for the final team, the rest 3 are decided by their results in the Nordic Mathematical Contest, which they will compete in afterwards.

 Pakistan 
In Pakistan, selection for the IMO participants is quite similar to that in other countries. The process starts one and a half year before a particular IMO; and a test (also known as NMTC - National Mathematics Talent Contest) is taken by the high school students which is organized by the Higher Education Commission of Pakistan. The test is held in January and the results are announced by April or May. About fifty students out of a 4000 are selected which are called by Abdus Salam School of Mathematics, Government College University, Pakistan - usually in September. The fifty selectees are taught at the school for a week or two and are then tested at the last two days of the camp. This process, involving the top 50, is known as First Camp. Based on the performance in the test, about 20 students are further selected for the Second Camp, and the rest are dropped. These 20 students are joined by 30 students (from NMO - National Mathematics Olympiad) in the Second Camp. Ten students from the 50 are then selected, again based on their performance in a test. Third Camp is the final camp, and 5 are screened out of these 10. These would be the finalised participants for IMO.

Alternatively, high school students from all over Pakistan take NMO (National Mathematics Olympiad) which is organized by Abdus Salam School itself. About 30 are selected which join the NMTC top 20 students in Second Camp. This test is held after the result of the First Camp of NMTC is announced. Students who do not qualify the First Camp of NMTC can still take the NMO if they wish to come to the Second Camp.

Sometimes, the selection process may involve more than three camps and the number of students selected per camp can vary from the figures provided above.

 External links 
Official site of Science Olympiads in Pakistan, in English
Official site of the Abdus Salam School of Mathematical Sciences, the home institution for the training/selection of IMO in Pakistan, in English

 The Philippines 
The selection process starts with the Philippine Mathematical Olympiad (PMO), which includes a qualifying stage, an area stage, and a national stage. The National Finalists (roughly the top twenty) of the PMO will be invited to a two-month training camp. The top students (at most six) in the selection tests given during this training camp will make up the IMO team.

 Poland 
In Poland the selection is based on the results of the Polish Mathematical Olympiad (Olimpiada Matematyczna), which includes a qualifying stage, a regional stage, and a national stage. Top 6 students of the national stage qualify to the IMO. In case of a draw, either the results of a regional stage or the run-off during a training camp for the IMO can be used.

 Portugal 
In Portugal, there are four selection steps. The three first are the exams of the Portuguese Mathematics Olympiad and the last is composed of several exams made by Projecto Delfos, who also prepares the students for international competitions.

 Romania 
In Romania those that enter the Romanian National Team on Mathematical Olympiad are selected from four rounds: School, City, County and National. In the case of Bucharest, being some 5 times larger than the largest county, as well as having larger schools, the rounds are: school, sector (a borough, roughly), city and national. From the first two rounds the advancing pupils are chosen using a minimum grade threshold (usually 8.00/10.00). From the city/county round advance the top five (fewer in certain cases), with a playoff round organised if necessary. The national round offers fifteen medals (five of each colour). A team (plus reserve) is selected from the medal winners, usually following a playoff round.

 Russia 
Russia possesses a very extensive system of selecting and training participants for IMO. Different aspects of solving mathematical problems are studied and revealed: combinatorics, logics, structural arrangement and proofs. All problems are evaluated from 7 points. Top participants obtain certificates of 3 degrees ("1st", "2nd" and "3rd diploma") and often additional "commendable certificates". Totally up to half of participants (in the last 2 rounds) gain diplomas.

The official rounds (each picking about 1/3 top of the previous) are: School, Borough, Region, and national. More details:
 School round (I stage) is a public stage - every interested pupil of 4-11 grade can participate. Completely organized by every school this competition aimed more at popularisation than at selection.
 Borough round (II stage) for some schools (specifically ones that has winners of region round) is equal to the School round.
 Region round (III stage) is the first which brings together participants in one place to live for some days. It has two rounds on its own. In Moscow they are separated with process of selection, but in less populated regions pupils take part in both. In present days problems for all rounds starting with region round are created by special central committee. There are juries in each region of roughly constant membership. Winners of the region rounds usually have privileges for high-school entering.
 National round' (IV stage) aimed at selection the most prominent pupils for participation in IMO. For this sake about 14 top of national round from 10th and 11th grades (usually "1st diplomas") are combined in following summer and winter "gatherings" for special training and further selection.

Singapore

In Singapore,the SMO (Singapore Mathematical Olympiad) is held with three sections- Junior (Grade 7 and 8), Senior (Grades 9 and 10) and Open (Grades 11 and 12). There are two rounds and the top 20 from the first 2 rounds sit 2 National Team Selection tests where they are selected for the final IMO team.

 South Africa 
In South Africa those who would be members of the team must pass through a nationwide talent search by correspondence, after which the top fifty or so are selected for a camp (usually in the December holidays) at Stellenbosch University. A number of rounds of monthly problem sets are issued by the University of Cape Town which are taken into consideration, along with the camp marks to select the top fifteen/sixteen to go to a final selection camp at Rhodes University, Grahamstown or more recently the University of the Free State, Bloemfontein in April. A final training camp takes place at the University of Cape Town or more recently, the University of Pretoria just before the IMO. The Asian Pacific Mathematics Olympiad has been used informally as a test, along with an IMO selection test written at the schools of the top fifteen in the event of indecision.

 Spain 

In Spain there are two rounds.

The first one is held in each university district. There are two written tests, in which six or eight problems are to be solved, depending on the region. The first three participants in each district go to the national round.

This one also consists of two written tests, three and half hours long each, with a total of six problems. The top six scorers go onto the International Olympiad.

 Sweden 
In Sweden, a mathematics contest called "Skolornas Matematiktävling" is held every autumn. Those who qualify to the finale are invited to participate in a correspondence course in problem solving as well as the Nordic Mathematical Contest. From the combined results of the qualification round, the correspondence course and the finale and NMC, the six highest achievers of the Swedish finalists are invited to join the Swedish IMO team.

 Taiwan 
In Taiwan, the selection process consists of three sessions, starting from mid March to the end of April. Students who rank among the top 30 in the Taiwanese Mathematical Olympiad test can participate the first session. During each session students will be tested by six IMO-style problems, and top six students will be selected as the members of the Taiwanese IMO team. The training sessions will be held during May and June.

 Thailand 
In Thailand, the selection of the IMO representatives is the responsibility of the organization "The Promotion of Academic Olympiad and The Development of Science Education Foundation". There are many branches of this organization around the country. At the end of August, a 30-question exam is open to all high school students to select 60 students to join each camp (there are about 20 camps) in each branch of the country for promoting mathematics skills, known in Thailand as "POSN Camp 1". The topics include Algebra, Geometry, Number Theory, Combinatorics, and Logic. After the camp, an exam is given in each of the preceding topics to evaluate the skills. A number of students, usually 30, are selected to join another camp in March, known in Thailand as "POSN Camp 2". The topics include Algebra, Geometry, Number Theory, and Combinatorics in an advanced level, Functional Equation, and Inequality. After the camp, an exam is given and 6 students are selected from each branch of the country to compete in the Thailand Mathematical Olympiad. Anyone with gold or silver medal (about 40 students) will continue to the camp known as "IPST Camp 1", and an exam is given, and some, usually 25, are selected to "IPST Camp 2", finally, only 6 students will compete in the International Mathematical Olympiad.

 United Kingdom 
In the UK, selection is through competitions and training camps under the auspices of the United Kingdom Mathematics Trust, starting with the multiple-choice Senior Mathematical Challenge (SMC).  The SMC is followed by the British Mathematical Olympiad (BMO), held in two rounds, but candidates who did not take part in the SMC or did not achieve the qualifying score may enter the BMO on payment of an entry fee and so be considered for the IMO team.  After the two rounds of the BMO, 20 potential team members, chosen primarily based on BMO results, are invited to a training and selection camp held in Trinity College, Cambridge, during which further examinations are held, allowing the number of potential team members to be reduced to eight or nine. A final camp is subsequently held at Oundle School, after which six students are chosen as the team and the remaining two or three as reserves.  In addition to this formal selection process, there is further training during the year for a squad of potential team members, including the 'Advanced Mentoring Scheme', practice exams and an annual training camp in Hungary; information from exams at the Hungary camp may be considered in selection where available.

 United States 
In the United States, the team is selected through the American Mathematics Competitions.

 Vietnam 
Vietnam has very extensive system of selecting and training participants for IMO. Different aspects of solving mathematical problems are studied and revealed: combinatorics, logics, structural arrangement and proofs. The first official rounds are: School (Trường), District (Quận), Province (Tỉnh) or Municipality (Thành phố trực thuộc trung ương), and National (Quốc gia''). For some schools, the Province Round is equal to their School round. The National Round is often called the Vietnam Mathematical Olympiad (VMO). After VMO, the top 40 scorers will participate in the last round, the Vietnam Team Selection Test, or Vietnam TST. 6 students with the highest scores on Vietnam TST will be the 6 competitors for IMO.

Tunisia 
There are two math associations: ATCCM (Association Tunisienne de Culture et Competitions Mathematique) and ATSM(Association Tunisienne des Sciences Mathematiques) . Each one has its own tests and have the right to choose 3 competitors for IMO, until 2019: they chose together 6 competitors. The arrangement changed this May.

References 

Mathematics competitions
International Mathematical Olympiad